The 1979 All-Ireland Senior Football Championship Final was the 92nd All-Ireland Final and the deciding match of the 1979 All-Ireland Senior Football Championship, an inter-county Gaelic football tournament for the top teams in Ireland.

Kerry had Páidí Ó Sé sent off but still won by 11 points.

It was the fourth of four All-Ireland football titles won by Kerry in the 1970s.

References

All-Ireland Senior Football Championship Final
All-Ireland Senior Football Championship Final, 1979
All-Ireland Senior Football Championship Finals
All-Ireland Senior Football Championship Finals
Dublin county football team matches
Kerry county football team matches